Clionaida is an order of demosponges in the subclass Heteroscleromorpha.

Familiae 
Familiae within this order include:

 Acanthochaetetidae Fischer, 1970
 Clionaidae d'Orbigny, 1851
 Placospongiidae Gray, 1867
 Spirastrellidae Ridley & Dendy, 1886

References

External links 
 

Heteroscleromorpha
Sponge orders